Basil Mahdi (1 January 1943 – 31 March 2020) was a former Iraqi football midfielder who played for Iraq between 1965 and 1969. He played in the 1964 Arab Nations Cup and 1966 Arab Nations Cup.

On 31 March 2020, Mahdi died at the age of 77.

References

Iraqi footballers
Iraq international footballers
Al-Shorta SC managers
2020 deaths
Association football midfielders
Iraqi football managers